Leswis José Landaeta Ferreira (born 24 May 2000) is a Venezuelan footballer who plays as a midfielder for Venezuelan Primera División side Aragua F.C.

Club career
Landaeta made his professional debut for Aragua in the 2017 season, and despite his young age, was credited for his control and vision.

Career statistics

Club

Notes

References

2000 births
Living people
Venezuelan footballers
Association football midfielders
Venezuelan Primera División players
Aragua FC players
21st-century Venezuelan people